Poleto is a village in the municipality of Delčevo, North Macedonia.

Demographics
As of the 2021 census, Poleto had 198 residents with the following ethnic composition:
Macedonians 192
Persons for whom data are taken from administrative sources 3
Albanians 2
Others 1

According to the 2002 census, the village had a total of 194 inhabitants. Ethnic groups in the village include:
Macedonians 186
Romani 8

References

Villages in Delčevo Municipality